The Bureau of Indian Affairs Unalakleet School, also known as the Unalakleet Day School and BIA School and Quarters, is a historic school complex in Unalakleet, Alaska, a small community about  southeast of Nome at the mouth of the Unalakleet River.  The complex includes the main school building, a light plant, a warehouse and the former Teacher's Quarters, Clinic's Quarters and Duplex Quarters across 2nd Street. The school building is a Georgian Revival structure,  stories in height, built in 1933 with balloon framing, a gable roof with octagonal cupola, and a concrete foundation.  Shed-roof dormers were added in 1937, and an addition in 1954.  The building housed classrooms and other facilities on the first two floors, and two small apartments in the attic space (the latter part of the 1937 work).  The school was built by the United States Bureau of Indian Affairs as part of a major program to improve the education of Alaska's Native population, and was operated from these premises until 1978, when the state built a new school.

The school was listed on the National Register of Historic Places in 2002.

See also
National Register of Historic Places listings in Nome Census Area, Alaska

References

1933 establishments in Alaska
School buildings completed in 1933
Bureau of Indian Education
Defunct schools in Alaska
Buildings and structures on the National Register of Historic Places in Nome Census Area, Alaska
School buildings on the National Register of Historic Places in Alaska
Native American history of Alaska